Nicholas Raymond Thomas Etten (September 19, 1913 – October 18, 1990) was a first baseman in major league baseball, who played for the Philadelphia Athletics (1938–39), Philadelphia Phillies (1941–42, 1947) and New York Yankees (1943–46). Etten batted and threw left-handed. He was born in Spring Grove, Illinois. Etten attended St. Rita of Cascia High School on the south side of Chicago.

Etten attended Villanova University and was drafted by the Athletics from the Oakland Oaks minor league team. He made his major league debut with the Athletics late in 1938, also playing part-time for them in 1939. During his four-year stint with the Yankees, Etten also ranked among league leaders in most offensive categories, was a member of the 1943 World Champion team, and was selected to the All-Star Game in 1945. In 1947, he appeared in fourteen games for the Phillies before retiring. 
 
In a nine-season career, Etten was a .277 hitter with 89 home runs and 526 RBIs. Playing every inning of his career as a first baseman, he recorded a .988 fielding percentage.

Etten died in Hinsdale, Illinois, at the age of 77.

See also
 List of Major League Baseball annual runs batted in leaders
 List of Major League Baseball annual home run leaders

External links

1913 births
1990 deaths
American League All-Stars
New York Yankees players
Philadelphia Athletics players
Philadelphia Phillies players
Major League Baseball first basemen
People from Spring Grove, Illinois
Baseball players from Illinois
American League home run champions
American League RBI champions
Davenport Blue Sox players
Little Rock Travelers players
Elmira Pioneers players
Birmingham Barons players
Oklahoma City Indians players
Savannah Indians players
Wilkes-Barre Barons (baseball) players
Jacksonville Tars players
Baltimore Orioles (IL) players
Newark Bears (IL) players
Oakland Oaks (baseball) players
Milwaukee Brewers (minor league) players
Memphis Chickasaws players
Villanova Wildcats baseball players